Ellabella johnstoni is a moth in the Copromorphidae family. It is found in Washington.

The length of the forewings is 11–13 mm for males and 10.5 mm for females. The forewings are tan with a dark brown area on most of the mid-wing. The hindwings are pale grey-tan. Adults are on wing from April to May.

References

Natural History Museum Lepidoptera generic names catalog

Copromorphidae
Moths described in 1984